Bunting Island Bridge is a bridge that connects Bunting Island to mainland Yan, Kedah state, Malaysia. The bridge was built by the Malaysian Public Works Department (JKR) while the main contractor was Gamuda Berhad.

History
It was constructed between 2002 and 2005.

The bridge remains underused and has become a white elephant project. It has been widely criticised for the facts that it had served no purpose of  linking to an unpopulated island which incurred a project cost of  RM 120 million. 

Disenchantment of the locals remains unknown to the rest of the country.

Features
It is a  ×  sea crossing consisting of a  bridge, a  causeway connecting Bunting Island to the bridge and a  causeway connecting mainland Kedah to the bridge. The bridge is  an arch cable-stayed bridge with a main suspended span of 80 m in length and approach spans of precast concrete box beams with spans of 30 m in  length. The causeways have fill embankments on piled foundations with rock armouring.

References

External links
 Bunting Island Bridge ( Jambatan Pulau Bunting )
 Bunting Island Bridge, Kedah
 Bunting Island Bridge at WikiMapia.org

Bridges completed in 2005
Bridges in Kedah
Tied arch bridges
2005 establishments in Malaysia
Yan District